Flight 529 may refer to:
TWA Flight 529 (1961)
Atlantic Southeast Airlines Flight 529 (1995)

0529